Tréglonou is a commune in the Finistère department of Brittany in north-western France.

Population
Inhabitants of Tréglonou are called in French Tréglonousiens.

See also
 Communes of the Finistère department

References

 Mayors of Finistère Association

External links

 Official website 

Communes of Finistère